Hayley Green Wood is a   Local Nature Reserve on the northern outskirts of Bracknell in Berkshire. It is owned and managed by Bracknell Forest Borough Council.

Geography and site

This site is mainly on London clay and habitats include mixed deciduous woodland with ash, willow and silver birch trees. The reserve also includes a pond.

History

Hayley Green Wood was once a part of Warfield Park, an extensive estate which was owned by Colonel John Walsh in 1766. In 2002 2002 Hayley Green Wood was incorporated into Westmorland Park.

In 2003 the site was declared as a local nature reserve by Bracknell Forest Borough Council.

Fauna

The site has the following fauna:

Amphibians and Reptiles

Grass snake

Birds

Eurasian bullfinch

Flora

The site has the following flora:

Trees

Fraxinus
Betula pendula

Plants

Leucanthemum vulgare
Prunella vulgaris
Digitalis
Hyacinthoides non-scripta

References

Local Nature Reserves in Berkshire
Warfield